Vajram may refer to:

 Vajram (1995 film), a 1995 Telugu film
 Vajram (2004 film), a 2004 Malayalam drama film
 Vajram (2015 film), a 2015 Tamil film